Amal Muhammad 'Ali al-Shami (1956–2001) was a Yemeni writer.

Born in Sana'a, al-Shami was active in many fields during her career; she wrote poetry and short stories as well as screenplays for television and radio. Much of her work was published under various pseudonyms. Her stories often criticized the patriarchal nature of society, and presented education and writing as a means by which independence could be achieved.

References

1956 births
2001 deaths
Yemeni women poets
Yemeni poets
Yemeni short story writers
Women short story writers
Yemeni screenwriters
Women television writers
Radio writers
20th-century poets
20th-century short story writers
20th-century women writers
People from Sanaa
Women radio writers
20th-century screenwriters